Morris Murdock Travel is a travel agency headquartered in Salt Lake City, Utah, United States, with 6 additional offices in Utah (Bountiful, Draper, Ogden, Orem and St. George) and Montana (Billings) and home-based agents located throughout Utah, Idaho and Montana. The agency primarily facilitates cruises, escorted tours, group travel, airfare, hotel accommodations, car rentals, full vacation packages, honeymoon/anniversary travel, luxury travel, and incentive travel programs.

History

Morris Murdock Travel began in 1958 when the Church of Jesus Christ of Latter-day Saints (LDS Church) approached Franklin Murdock about starting an agency to handle the travel needs of its employees and missionaries. The modern Morris Murdock Travel is the result of combining multiple other travel companies, including the 1996 merger of Morris Travel and Beehive Tours and Travel  and the 2000 merger of Morris Travel and Murdock Travel, among others. The company also developed from several acquisitions including Seattle's Diamond Travel in 1995, Corporate Travel Services in 1996, and Utah's LDS Travel Study, a provider of LDS faith-based travel, in November 2008. In addition, Morris Travel started Morris Air in 1984, which chartered flights to Hawaii and Mexico from Utah. Due to its growth, Morris Air was sold to Southwest Airlines in 1995. Morris Murdock sold its business travel division to Hess Travel in January 2009 in order to better serve its corporate clients.

In 1997, ownership of Morris Travel and Murdock Travel (which stood as two separate companies) belonged to Yamagata Enterprises and the officers of the company, respectively. In 2004, Crestwood Communications, LLC (a subsidiary of Simmons Media Group), took full control of the then-merged Morris Murdock Travel.

As the oldest and largest privately owned leisure travel agency in Utah and the Intermountain region of the United States, Morris Murdock became an associate of CWT in 2002 and joined the American Express U.S. Representative Travel Network in July 2007. In the first quarter of 2010, Morris Murdock Travel left American Express and joined the Signature Travel Network, an international network of 190 agencies that generates $4 billion in annual travel sales.

Due to the nature of the travel industry's relation to the overall health of local economies, Morris Murdock has undergone several changes to survive first the economic downturns that began in 2007 with the outbreak of the H1N1 Swine Influenza followed by the economic recession of the late 2000s. These changes include closing the company's Helena, Orem, Pocatello and Idaho Falls offices and a reduction in workforce at the company's remaining locations. Morris Murdock reopened their Orem, Utah location in April 2010.

Company Divisions

 Morris Murdock Escorted Tours (MMET) is the "group travel" department of Morris Murdock Travel which specializes in hosted vacation tours and cruises to destinations using experienced guides and directors. Formed as a separate company in 1958, MMET was the first tour operator to offer Latter-day Saint (Mormon) faith-based and Church History escorted tours. 
 Morris Meetings and Incentives' (MMI) was originally started in 1996 as a group leisure branch of Morris Murdock Travel and was formed into a separate company in 1998. The company focuses on specialized programs for incentive groups, meetings, conference and executive retreats. 
 Black Pearl Luxury Services is a division of Morris Murdock that focuses on luxury, exotic, F.I.T. (Foreign Independent Travel) and higher-end travel. 
 LDS Travel Study (LDSTS) is a sub-company of Morris Murdock Travel that focuses on escorted tours for members of the Latter-day Saint (Mormon) faith. Founded after Brigham Young University closed down their travel department, Morris Murdock purchased LDS Travel Study in November 2008 for an undisclosed amount. A lawsuit between Morris Murdock Travel and former LDS Travel Study owner Doug Wren regarding un-forwarded customer deposits and quarterly revenue percentages was filed in August 2009.

 Jensen Baron Travel Express is an air consolidator sub-company of Morris Murdock Travel formed in 1984 that offers discounted airfare and increased commissions for travel agents to locations in Hawaii, Europe, North America, the Middle East, Central America and South America. The company is currently negotiating rates and commissions for flights to Asia.
 SOLO Independent Contractor Program is a program developed by Morris Murdock to provide an avenue of support for independent travel consultants that allows travel agents to create their own "company" under the umbrella of Morris Murdock Travel.

Leadership Staff

 Brian Hollien – President
 Brent Jenson – Regional Manager
 Gary Sorenson – Regional Manager
 Wendy Fracchia – Director Group Travel Services
 Kathy Hirst – Director Black Pearl Luxury Travel Services
 Karrie Stewart – Manager Information Systems
 David Peaden – Controller

References

External links 
 Morris Murdock Travel

Travel agencies
Companies based in Salt Lake City
1958 establishments in Utah
Travel and holiday companies of the United States